Deleni is a commune in Iași County, Western Moldavia, Romania. It is composed of six villages: Deleni, Feredeni, Leahu-Nacu, Maxut, Poiana and Slobozia.

Natives
 Theodor Speranția

References

Communes in Iași County
Localities in Western Moldavia